The Azencross is a cyclo-cross race held in Loenhout village, Wuustwezel, Belgium, which until 2021 was part of the DVV Trophy.

Past winners

References
 Men's results
 Women's results

UCI Cyclo-cross World Cup
Cycle races in Belgium
Cyclo-cross races
Recurring sporting events established in 1984
1984 establishments in Belgium
Sport in Antwerp Province
Wuustwezel